Major Abhey Singh, (14 August 1922 – June 1981) was a cavalry officer in the Indian Army.

Early life
Abhey Singh was born in the Thikana of Palaitha in the Princely state of Kotah on 14 August 1922, the youngest son of Major-General Sir Onkar Singh, KCIE, a minister for the state of Kotah.  He attended the Prince of Wales Royal Indian Military College (RIMC) from 20 January 1934 to October 1940.  Afterwards he entered the Indian Military Academy.

Military career
Upon graduation he was commissioned as a Second Lieutenant with the 18th King Edward's Own Cavalry on 1 December 1941.  His regiment was part of the 3rd Indian Motor Brigade, which was fighting in the North African Campaign under General Ritchie’s British 8th Army.  During the Battle of Gazala, his brigade formed the southernmost point of the Gazala Line near Bir Hacheim.  On 27 May 1942, Italy’s Ariete Armoured Division overran the 3rd Indian Motor Brigade.  Following this defeat, Abhey Singh was taken prisoner and sent to P. G. 71 in Aversa near Naples for internment.  In May 1943, he was sent to P. G. 91 in Avezzano.  In the confusion that followed the Italian surrender in September 1943, he would escape from Avezzano with Maj. P. P. Kumaramangalam and Lt. Sahabzada Yaqub Khan.  Lt. Yaqub Khan spoke Italian which enabled them to solicit assistance from rural Italians who were sympathetic to the Allies.  They spent four to five months attempting to move south to Allied lines, but were subsequently re-captured by German forces.  Following his re-capture, he spent the remainder of the war in Oflag 79 near Braunschweig.  His camp was eventually liberated by the US Ninth Army on 12 April 1945.

After the Second World War ended, Abhey Singh was transferred to the 17th Queen Victoria’s Own Cavalry (The Poona Horse).  In 1948, Major Abhey Singh participated in Operation Polo.  On 6 September 1948, Abhey Singh led a tank squadron against the Nizam of Hyderabad’s troops who had been harassing the citizens of Mangala Enclave in south-western Hyderabad State.  The engagement resulted in the capture of two officers, four JCOs, and 90 other ranks.of the Hyderabad Army.  To show their gratitude, the citizens of Mangala Enclave presented a silver replica of the Ashoka Pillar to Major Abhey Singh.

Campaign Medals
 1939-45 Star
 Africa Star
 War Medal 1939-1945

Indian Army Decorations
 Wound Medal

See also
Indian Army

References

External links
 Indian Army
 Bharat Rakshak: The Consortium of Indian Military Websites
 Indian Military Academy

Indian Army officers
British Indian Army officers
People from Rajasthan
Rashtriya Indian Military College alumni
1922 births
1981 deaths
Indian Army personnel of World War II
Indian prisoners of war
World War II prisoners of war held by Italy
Indian escapees
Escapees from Italian detention
World War II prisoners of war held by Germany
Indian Military Academy alumni